The People & Places series is a collection of short subject documentary films produced by Walt Disney Productions roughly between the years 1953 and 1960. The series (except The Alaskan Eskimo, Siam, Sardinia, and The Blue Men of Morocco) was filmed in CinemaScope and filming location were countries around the world which the Disney staff visited.

In October 2019, it was announced that the series would be revived for the Disney+ streaming service. Supper Club is producing the series under its April 2019 first look deal with Disney+. However, as of January 2023, nothing further has been heard regarding its status.

Films in the series

DVD release
"Disneyland U.S.A." was released as part of the limited edition Disney Treasures DVD entitled "Walt Disney Treasures: Disneyland Secrets, Stories & Magic".

References

Film series introduced in 1953
Disney documentary films
Documentary film series